The 1876 Chicago White Stockings season was the 5th season of the Chicago White Stockings franchise, the 1st in the National League and the 3rd at 23rd Street Grounds. The White Stockings, as one of the founding members of the new National League, won the NL's initial championship during this season with a record of 52–14.

Regular season

Season standings

Record vs. opponents

Roster

Player stats

Batting

Starters by position
Note: Pos = Position; G = Games played; AB = At bats; H = Hits; Avg. = Batting average; HR = Home runs; RBI = Runs batted in

Other batters
Note: G = Games played; AB = At bats; H = Hits; Avg. = Batting average; HR = Home runs; RBI = Runs batted in

Pitching

Starting pitchers
Note: G = Games pitched; IP = Innings pitched; W = Wins; L = Losses; ERA = Earned run average; SO = Strikeouts

Other pitchers
Note: G = Games pitched; IP = Innings pitched; W = Wins; L = Losses; ERA = Earned run average; SO = Strikeouts

Relief pitchers
Note: G = Games pitched; W = Wins; L = Losses; SV = Saves; ERA = Earned run average; SO = Strikeouts

References
1876 Chicago White Stockings season at Baseball Reference

Chicago Cubs seasons
Chicago White Stockings season
National League champion seasons
Chicago Cubs